Belief & Betrayal is a graphic adventure video game developed by Artematica and published by Lighthouse Interactive.

Reception

On Metacritic, the game received a score of 53 out of 100 based on 11 reviews, indicating "mixed or average reviews".

References

Christian video games
Windows games
Windows-only games
Video games developed in Italy
Video games set in London
Adventure games
2008 video games
Lighthouse Interactive games